In certain universities (including some colleges of University of Oxford and the University of Edinburgh), a servitor was an undergraduate student who received free accommodation (and some free meals), and was exempted from paying fees for lectures.  The term is still used at the University of Edinburgh, where it refers to the staff who are responsible for security, mail and reception (similar to porters at other universities) and are also on duty at formal occasions, when their functions include carrying the mace and ushering.

At Oxford, servitors were originally expected to act as servants to the fellows of their college. By 1852 this requirement had largely fallen into disuse, and the term had been replaced (often by clerk or Bible-clerk) at most colleges. The last recorded use of the term in Oxford was in 1867 (at Christ Church; the following year the same people were called exhibitioners).

See also
 Sizar (University of Cambridge)
 Batteler

References

History of education in the United Kingdom